This is a list of notable Rijksmonuments in Urk.

Urk

Urk